Antonutti is a surname. It derived from the Antonius root name. Notable people with this surname include the following:

Michele Antonutti (born 1986), Italian basketball player
Omero Antonutti (born 1935), Italian actor

See also

Antonetti
Ildebrando Antoniutti

References

Patronymic surnames